Passenger Records was a New York City-based boutique record label that released music by adult album alternative (or Triple-A) artists. A subsidiary of Caroline Records, it was owned by Virgin Records/EMI. Its albums were distributed by Caroline Distribution in the US and Virgin or a variety of smaller labels throughout Europe, Australia, Japan and other markets. Passenger most notably represented Ben Folds Five for Caroline, releasing the band's 1995 self-titled debut album. Other artists represented by the label include the defunct Philadelphia band The Low Road.

In a 1997 interview, after his band had signed with Sony's Epic/550 label and released their second album Whatever and Ever Amen, Ben Folds spoke about both Passenger and The Low Road:

The Passenger Records label was dissolved in the mid-to-late 1990s. Artists either continued their contracts on with Caroline Records or signed with other labels.

References

American record labels
EMI
1994 establishments in New York (state)
1990s disestablishments in New York (state)
Record labels established in 1994
Companies disestablished in the 1990s